The New Klezmer Quintet is a traditional klezmer band originally from the Washington, D.C. area. The group is also a neo-klezmer ensemble performing klezmer music while incorporating elements of modern Israeli folk music, ladino, jazz, Swing music, Latin music, and rock and roll styles. The band was formed in 2001 at the Lansing Michigan Jazz Festival when a group of independent conservatory trained professional musicians
with their own bands came together to jam. The New Klezmer Quintet has an older sister band called The Kol Haruach Orchestra which plays private events, while the main band plays strictly concert venues. Kol Haruach means voice of the spirit which embodies the groups improvisational and audience pleasing performance style.

Current members of the group are
 Brian Choper – Band manager and drummer
 Fred Jacobowitz – Clarinet and saxophone
 Judy Spokes Cho – Violin
 Lou Durham – Piano and keyboard
 Bill Hones – Bass

The group is rising to become one of the most highly esteemed klezmer bands in the country. According to agents, between their standards and the original music, the band is known to draw a multi-ethnic crowd of between 1000–1500 people per concert, easily selling out major shows. The group has performed at the Millennium Stage at The Kennedy Center, Martin Luther King Jr. Memorial Library, Strathmore Hall in Bethesda, Md., and the National Museum of the American Indian as well as benefit concerts at local synagogues. The group played in festivities for the first inauguration of Barack Obama and has been simulcast on NPR. Guest artists with the group have included accomplished cantors Phil Greenfield and Ramon Tasat.

The New Klezmer Quintet has the flexibility to sound like a klezmer band from the "old country" evoking images of the Jewish shtetl, a swing band tributing Duke Ellington, or a rock band covering Santana and The Village People. Most of all this group of creative artists love to write their own tunes, combining these various styles to make a brand new sound for today's audiences; sometimes called klezmer-rock.

References 

Kennedy Center
Washington Jewish Week
American Indian
What's Up Magazine
Klezmershack.com

Discography 

2004-In the Beginning...Bereshit; Entertainment Connection
2005-Kol Haruach-Live in Concert;Klezmer and Jazz-Together at Last; Entertainment Connection
2008-"Unexpected Joy"-The New Klezmer Quintet-Live in Concert w/ Ramon Tasat; Entertainment Connection

External links 
The New Klezmer Quintet official website
The Kol Haruach Band official website

American folk musical groups
Klezmer groups